The Alvin Show is a music album by Alvin and the Chipmunks. It is the soundtrack album to the Chipmunks' first animated television series The Alvin Show. Upon the release of the album, the Chipmunks' first three albums were reissued with revised album cover art that utilized the cartoon redesigns of the characters.

Track listing

Side one 
 "The Alvin Show Opening Theme" (Ross Bagdasarian) - 1:37
 "The Mrs. Frumpington Story/Mrs. Frumpington's Song" (Ross Bagdasarian) - 6:38
 "A Visit to France/I Wish I Could Speak French" (Ross Bagdasarian) - 3:48

Side two 
 "Television Interview/Chipmunk Fun" (Ross Bagdasarian) - 3:48
 "Crashcup Invents the Bathtub/Crashcup's Work Theme (One Finger Waltz)" (based on "Sack Time") (Ross Bagdasarian Sr.) - 4:03
 "Witch Doctor" (Ross Bagdasarian) – 2:22
 "The Alvin Show Closing Theme" - 1:10

Band lineup 
Ross Bagdasarian Sr. provided the voices for the Chipmunks and David Seville.
 Alvin: Guitars and vocals
 Simon: Bass and vocals
 Theodore: Drums and vocals

Additional personnel 
 Lee Patrick/June Foray – voice of Mrs. Frumpington
 Shepard Menken – voice of Clyde Crashcup; voice of "Harry" ("Television Interview/Chipmunk Fun" segment)

Production crew 
 Ross Bagdasarian Sr. – producer
 David Hassinger – engineer
 James Getzoff – orchestrator

References 

Alvin and the Chipmunks albums
Television animation soundtracks
1961 soundtrack albums
Children's music albums
Capitol Records albums
Liberty Records soundtracks